Paoh may refer to:

Hoonah Airport, Hoonah, Alaska
Pa'O people, an ethnic group in Burma